Kinzel is a German surname. Notable people with the name include:

 Anton Kinzel (born 1922), Austrian chess player
 Augustus Braun Kinzel (1900–1987), American metallurgist
 Eberhard Kinzel (1897–1945), German general
 Dick Kinzel (born 1940), American business executive, CEO of Cedar Fair Entertainment Company
 Gisela Kinzel (born 1961), German athlete
 Marianne Kinzel, mid-20th century Czechoslovak-British designer of knitted lace patterns

German-language surnames